Mirko Medić (Serbian Cyrillic: Мирко Медић; born November 23, 1980) is a Serbian former footballer who played as a defender and is currently the head coach for Scarborough SC in the Canadian Soccer League.

Playing career 
Medić began his career in 1995 in the Second League of FR Yugoslavia, where he had stints with Budućnost Valjevo and FK Železničar Lajkovac. In 2001, he played in the First League of FR Yugoslavia with FK Mladost Lučani. In 2006, he went overseas to Canada to sign with the Serbian White Eagles FC of the Canadian Soccer League. In his debut season, he was selected for the CSL All-Star roster against Clyde FC. Further achievements included clinching the International division title, and featuring in the CSL Championship final against Italia Shooters. For the second year in a row, he was named an all-star for the 2007 season. In 2008, he won the CSL Championship in a 2-1 win in a penalty shootout against Trois-Rivières Attak. In 2009, he was named the CSL Defender of the Year.

On July 21, 2010, Medić was part of the Toronto FC side that played an international friendly against Bolton Wanderers at BMO Field.

In 2013, he signed with Brampton City United, where he helped Brampton clinch a postseason berth. In 2014, he was traded back to the White Eagles, and retired in 2015. In 2017, he played indoor soccer in the Arena Premier League with Serbia AC.

Managerial career 
After his retirement, he was appointed head coach along with Uroš Stamatović for Serbia in 2016. In his first season as manager, he led the team to their second championship. In 2021, he was named the head coach for league rivals Scarborough SC. In his debut season with Scarborough, he led the team to the ProSound Cup final but was defeated by FC Vorkuta in a penalty shootout. He also successfully led Scarborough to a CSL Championship by defeating Vorkuta in the playoffs. 

Medić re-signed with Scarborough for the 2022 season.

Honours

Player
Serbian White Eagles
Canadian Soccer League: 2008
Canadian Soccer League Defender of the Year: 2009

Manager
Serbian White Eagles
Canadian Soccer League: 2016

Scarborough SC
Canadian Soccer League: 2021

References 

1980 births
Living people
Sportspeople from Valjevo
Serbian footballers
FK Budućnost Valjevo players
FK Železničar Lajkovac players
FK Mladost Lučani players
Serbian White Eagles FC players
Brampton United players
First League of Serbia and Montenegro players
Canadian Soccer League (1998–present) players
Serbian football managers
Serbian White Eagles FC managers
Canadian Soccer League (1998–present) managers
Association football defenders